Donda C. West ( Williams; July 12, 1949 – November 10, 2007) was an American educator, author and chair of Chicago State University's Department of English, Communications, Media and Theater. She was the mother of rapper Ye, better known as Kanye West.

Early life and career 
West was raised in Oklahoma City, Oklahoma, the daughter of Lucille (Eckles) and Portwood Williams, Sr., a civil rights activist. She attended Douglass High School, graduating in 1967. She earned her bachelor's degree in English from Virginia Union University in 1971 and her doctoral degree from Auburn University in 1980. On August 19, 1958, she and her father took part in the Katz Drug Store sit-in in Oklahoma City.

She began her teaching career in the early 1970s at Morris Brown College in Atlanta and began working at Chicago State University in 1980. West taught English at Nanjing University for a year as a scholar through the Fulbright U.S. Scholar Program. In all, West spent 27 years at Chicago State, including 24 as head of the department of English, communications, media and theater. A statement from the university recalled West's role in establishing the university's Gwendolyn Brooks Center for Black Literature and Creative Writing "as an academic focus to teach writings of African-American authors and poets while fostering new literary talent."

West raised Kanye in the Chicago area along with her husband, Ray, from whom she separated when Kanye was 3. She retired in 2004 and moved to California to work full-time for her son. She was often seen at his side at parties and award shows. She was also a firm defender of her son's controversial comments. West stated that she "trained her son for greatness.” "There is no room for shyness. I raised him that way, to think critically and analytically and not be afraid to voice what you feel. I helped shape that. I think leaders are people who must do that." She was also chief executive of West Brands, the parent company of her son's businesses.

West, alongside her son, founded the non-profit Kanye West Foundation in 2003, tasked with a mission to battle dropout and illiteracy rates, while partnering with community organizations to provide underprivileged youth access to music education. The Foundation's first initiative, Loop Dreams, challenged at-risk students to learn how to write and produce music while simultaneously improving their academic skills.  In 2007, the foundation partnered with Strong American Schools as part of their "Ed in '08" campaign. In 2008, the foundation was renamed to the Dr. Donda West Foundation following her death. The Dr. Donda West Foundation was committed to providing high-quality programs in partnership with community organizations such as Challengers Boys & Girls Club in South Central Los Angeles, California. The foundation ceased operations in 2011.

Personal life 
In 1973, she married photographer Ray West. They welcomed their son Ye in 1977, and divorced in 1980.

Death 
On November 10, 2007, West died at age 58. In January 2008, the Los Angeles County coroner's office said that she had died of coronary artery disease and multiple post-operative factors from cosmetic surgery. Authorities in Los Angeles launched an investigation into her death after learning the doctor who operated on her had convictions for alcohol-related offenses and at least two major malpractice settlements.

Kanye played his first concert following her funeral at the O2 Arena in London on November 22. He dedicated a performance of "Hey Mama,” as well as a cover of Journey's "Don't Stop Believin',” to his mother, and did so on all other dates of his Glow in the Dark Tour.

Legacy 
California governor Arnold Schwarzenegger subsequently signed the "Donda West Law" in 2009. This legislation makes it mandatory for patients to receive medical clearance through a physical examination before undergoing elective cosmetic surgery.

West's memoir, Raising Kanye: Life Lessons from the Mother of a Hip-Hop Star, was published in 2009. West wrote in her book that she always wanted her son to go to college, but after witnessing his passion for hip hop and his talent producing beats, she later supported his decision to pursue music.

Kanye's writing partner and friend, Rhymefest, lamented West's death in an appearance on Chicago radio station WCGI. "She was everyone's mom," Rhymefest said. "A spirit never dies, a spirit lasts forever." Kanye and Rhymefest founded the non-profit Donda's House in 2013, a free music writing program with the goal of helping at-risk Chicago youth. It is aimed at students between 15 and 24, and includes lessons on how to write and record music. Their curriculum is based on the teaching philosophy and pedagogy of West with a focus on collaborative and experiential learning. Born Che Smith, Rhymefest grew up in Chicago, with Donda mentoring him as an educator. Donda's House was renamed Art of Culture, Incorporated after a contentious split between Rhymefest and Kanye.

In 2019, Garrard McClendon published Donda's Rules: The Scholarly Works of Dr. Donda West – Mother of Kanye West. McClendon is an associate professor of Educational Leadership and Policy Studies at Chicago State University. In 2013, McClendon enlisted the students in his Philosophy of Education classes to help him mine various archives for Donda West's full body of work: "The students did a wonderful job helping me find all of this archival material. We're talking her scholarly works, her dissertation, her master's thesis. We found personal notes of hers, poems of hers, hundreds of hours of her audio speeches.  So in those six years, we're compiling, we're editing, and having conference calls with Kanye," McClendon recounted.

Mahalia Ann Hines, Common's mother, said, "Donda was beautiful. She was intelligent, patient, and generous. Her words were written with power and this book proves it." Brenda M. Greene, professor and mother of recording artist Talib Kweli, said, "Donda and I were kindred spirits as sisters in the network of hip-hop mothers. She was an unsung leader who infused culture and 'knowledge of self' into the curriculum. Donda loved her students."

In popular culture 
She is the subject of Kanye's song "Hey Mama", which appeared on his 2005 album Late Registration. On "Touch the Sky" from the same album, Kanye thanks his mom for always supporting him during the lean times, especially when she drove him to New York from Chicago in a rented U-Haul van.

On January 5, 2012, Kanye announced his establishment of the creative content company DONDA, named after his mother.

Kanye also named his tenth studio album, released in 2021, Donda, after his mother. Kanye donated student tickets to Chicago State University for the listening session of the album.

On February 23, 2022, Kanye released Donda 2, his first sequel album to Donda. Later that year, Ye launched a marketing agency and clothing line named DONDA Sports. He also opened Donda Academy, a pre-kindergarten to Grade 12 Christian private school, in Simi Valley, California. The school's basketball team, the Donda Doves, includes top prospects from across the United States.

References 

1949 births
2007 deaths
African-American academics
American expatriate academics
American expatriates in China
American women academics
Auburn University alumni
Chicago State University faculty
Clark Atlanta University faculty
Deaths from coronary artery disease
Kanye West
Academic staff of Nanjing University
Teachers of English